The Pavelló de l'Ateneu de Sant Sadurní is an indoor arena located in Sant Sadurní d'Anoia, Catalonia. Opened in 1981, the venue was one of the hosts for the demonstration roller hockey competitions at the 1992 Summer Olympics.

References
1992 Summer Olympics official report.  Volume 2. pp. 337–41.

Buildings and structures completed in 1981
Venues of the 1992 Summer Olympics
Indoor arenas in Catalonia
Sports venues completed in 1981
Rink hockey in Catalonia